Fingerboard Corner (also The Finger Board Corner)  is an unincorporated community in Cheboygan County, Michigan, United States.

Notes

Unincorporated communities in Cheboygan County, Michigan
Unincorporated communities in Michigan